Solvathellam Unmai may refer to:

Solvathellam Unmai (film), a 1987 Tamil-language film
Solvathellam Unmai (TV series), a 2011 Tamil-language reality show